William R. Gant Farm is a historic home and farm located at Sand Creek Township, Bartholomew County, Indiana. The house was built about 1864, and is a two-story, vernacular Greek Revival style brick dwelling with a Federal style rear ell.  Also on the property is a contributing traverse-frame barn dated to the early-20th century.

It was listed on the National Register of Historic Places in 2000.

References

Farms on the National Register of Historic Places in Indiana
Federal architecture in Indiana
Greek Revival houses in Indiana
Houses completed in 1864
Buildings and structures in Bartholomew County, Indiana
National Register of Historic Places in Bartholomew County, Indiana